Bernardo is both a given name and a surname.

Bernardo may also refer to:

Bernardo, New Mexico, an unincorporated community
Bernardo, Texas, an unincorporated area
Bernardo Glacier, Chile
Bernardo (footballer, born 1965), Brazilian football midfielder
Bernardo (footballer, born 1995), Brazilian football full-back

See also
San Bernardo (disambiguation)